Tetrachthamalus is a genus of star barnacles in the family Chthamalidae. There are at least two described species in Tetrachthamalus.

Species
These species belong to the genus Tetrachthamalus:
 Tetrachthamalus oblitteratus Newman, 1967
 Tetrachthamalus sinensis Ren, 1980

References

Barnacles